The medical profile is the system of numbers the Israel Defense Forces (IDF) uses to indicate the medical suitability of a person in order to serve in various positions in the IDF. The profiles range between 21 (which automatically dismisses the subject from serving in the IDF) and 97 (which allows the subject to apply to every unit in the IDF). A profile of 64 and under makes it impossible to serve in direct combat roles.

Known profile numbers

Combatant
97: Perfectly healthy and fit for field combat units, in the elite units in the corps as well as in the combat battalions. In cases of very mild problems (such as the need for glasses), a note is added that does not lower the profile, but dismisses the soldier from volunteering to be a part of the elite units. Since 2005, soldiers can be accepted for the flight training course with glasses (up to 1 diopter).
82: A slight problem (for example: color blindness). Unfit for elite combat units but fit for infantry and the combat battalions.
72: A moderate problem (knee or back problems, mild asthma, allergies or a high level of myopia – above 7 diopters). Unfit for infantry service, but eligible for several combat units like the Armored Corps, Artillery, Air Defense, specific roles in the Field Intelligence Corps and the Caracal Battalion.
65: A problem or injury caused during the military service.

Non-combatant
64: A serious problem (asthma, low BMI, high blood pressure, mental health issues). Unfit for combat.
45: A very serious problem (severe asthma, severe orthopedic problems, severe mental status, HIV positive). Unfit for combat service and many military courses.
35: A special profile for people with diabetes, the hearing impaired and people with epilepsy. Able to serve in various roles with certain limitations due to their medical condition.
25: Individuals who received a profile of 21 and nonetheless applied to volunteer (and are accepted) for military service.
24: Temporarily unfit for service (severe sensitivity to bee stings, temporary low BMI, anemia). The soldier gets a temporary exemption and gets monitored every few months with the possibility of raising his profile.
21: Totally unfit for military service for health reasons (physical or mental). Individuals with this profile can still apply to volunteer for military service by getting a profile of 30. See Profile 21.

References

Israel Defense Forces